Yi Won-gye (이원계) (1330–1388), formally known as Grand Prince Wanpung (완풍대군), was a painter and warrior during the Later Goryeo Dynasty. He was the son of Yi Jachun and the elder half-brother of Yi Songgye, the founder of the Joseon dynasty.

Life 
Yi Won-gye was born in 1330 (17th year of King Chungsuk of Goryeo) in  Ssangseonggwanbu (later Yeongheungbu , Hamgyeong- do) of the Yuan dynasty, he is the half-brother of Yi Seong- gye.

His ancestors lived in Jeonju for generations, and then moved in Ssangseong Prefectures in the Yuan dynasty.

According to the Veritable Records of the Joseon Dynasty, Yi Won-gye and his three brothers always lived together in the same place since their childhood, that caused their bond to be very strong. Yi Wong-gye mastered the scriptures of Confucianism, wrote poetry well, and was good at horseback riding and archery.

During the Goryeo dynasty, he made many military achievements and was awarded the title of Prince Cheoksan (척산군)

Family 
Parents

 Father: Hwanjo of Joseon (20 January 1315 – 3 June 1361)
 Mother: Lady Yi of the Hansan Yi clan (한산 이씨, 夫人 李氏; d. 1333)
 Brother:  Yi Cheon-gye (이천계 )
 Sister: Lady Yi, of the Jeonju Yi clan (전주이씨)
 Half-Brother: Yi Seong-gye, King Taejo of Joseon (이성계 조선 태조) (4 November 1335 – 27 June 1408),

Consorts and their respective issue(s):

 Grand Lady of Samhan State, of the Gaesong Kim clan (삼한국대부인  개성 김씨)
 Yi Yang–U (완원부원군 이양우; 1346–1417), Internal Prince Wanwon, first son
 Yi Cheon–U (완산부원군 이천우; 1354–1417), Internal Prince Wansan, second son
 Lady Yi, of the Jeonju Yi clan (전주이씨), first daughter 
 Son-in-law: Yi In-U (이인우)
 Son-in-law: Jang Dam (장담;d. 4 February 1400)
 Grand Lady of Samhan State, of the Gyeongju Kim clan (삼한국대부인 경주김씨)
 Yi Jo (완남평부원군 이조; 1356–1408), Internal Prince Wannapyeong, third son
 Grand Lady of Samhan State, of the Nampyeong Mun clan (삼한국대부인 남평문씨), daughter of Mun Ikjeon-ui (문익점의 )
 Yi Baek-on ( 완령군  이백온), Prince Wanryeong, fourth son – a "Wonyun"( 원윤)
 Lady Yi, of the Jeonju Yi clan (전주이씨), second daughter 
 Son-in-law: No Sin (노신)
 Princess Sinhye, of the Jeonju Yi clan (신혜택주 이씨), third daughter
 Son-in-law: Byeon Jungryang (변중량)
 Son-in-law:  Yu Jeong–hyeon (유정현)
 Lady Yi, of the Jeonju Yi clan (전주이씨), fourth daughter
 Son-in-law: Hong Ro (홍로)
 Son-in-law: Byeon Cheohu  (변처후)

Popular culture
Portrayed by Kim Gyung-ha in the 1983 KBS TV series Foundation of the Kingdom.
Portrayed by Lee Sung-jong in the 1996–1998 KBS TV series Tears of the Dragon

References 

Korean princes
1330 births
1388 deaths
14th-century Korean people
Jeonju Yi clan